
Gmina Ujazd, German Gemeinde Ujest is an urban-rural gmina (administrative district) in Strzelce County, Opole Voivodeship, in south-western Poland.

Since 2006 the commune, like much of the area, has been officially bilingual in German and Polish, a large German population having remained in the area after it was transferred to Polish control.

Villages
The commune contains the villages and settlements of:

Ujazd
Balcarzowice
Buczek
Grzeboszowice
Jaryszów
Klucz
Kolonia Jaryszów
Komorniki
Kopanina
Księży Las
Niezdrowice
Nogowczyce
Olszowa
Sieroniowice
Stary Ujazd
Wesołów
Wydzierów
Zimna Wódka

Neighbouring gminas
Gmina Ujazd is bordered by the town of Kędzierzyn-Koźle and by the gminas of Leśnica, Rudziniec, Strzelce Opolskie and Toszek.

Twin towns – sister cities

Gmina Ujazd is twinned with:
 Bad Lobenstein, Germany
 Břidličná, Czech Republic
 Nusplingen, Germany

Gallery

References

Ujazd
Bilingual communes in Poland